Liaoning University of Technology, formerly Liaoning Institute of Technology, is a university in Jinzhou, Liaoning province, northeast China.

Founded in 1951, Liaoning University of Technology is a provincial university of higher learning, specializing in engineering,  but also offering instruction in science, liberal arts, economics, and management studies. It currently has over 14,000 undergraduates and 578 postgraduates, in 20 colleges and faculties teaching 38 undergraduate and 20 post-graduate specialities. The university employs 1,278 staff, including 780 full-time teachers.

The university has exchange programs with more than 20 foreign universities, administered by its School of International Education.

References

External links
Official website

Universities and colleges in Liaoning
Educational institutions established in 1951
1951 establishments in China
Technical universities and colleges in China